Park Hae-jung may refer to the following South Korean sportswomen:
 Park Hae-jung (footballer) (born 1977)
 Park Hae-jung (table tennis) (born 1972)

See also
 Park Hae-jin, South Korean actor